The 1983 European Fencing Championships were held in Lisbon, Portugal. The competition consisted of exclusively individual events.

Medal summary

Men's events

Women's events

Medal table

References 
 Results at the European Fencing Confederation

1983
European Fencing Championships
European Fencing Championships
International fencing competitions hosted by Portugal